John Middleton (died 1636) was an English landowner and politician who sat in the House of Commons between 1614 and 1629.

Middleton was born after 1558 to ironmaster Richard Middleton of Stoneham and his wife Mary Porter of Cuckfield. His father had built up an estate around Horsham, Sussex. Middleton came into possession of Hills Place, Horsham between 1610 and 1636.

In 1614, he was elected Member of Parliament for Horsham. He was re-elected MP for Horsham in 1621, 1624, 1625, 1626 and 1628. He sat until 1629 when King Charles decided to rule without parliament for eleven years. He was appointed High Sheriff of Surrey and Sussex for 1617–18.

Middleton married Frances Fowle, daughter of Nicholas Fowle of Rotherfield, Sussex. His son Thomas was also later MP for Horsham.

References

Year of birth missing
1636 deaths
English MPs 1614
English MPs 1621–1622
English MPs 1624–1625
English MPs 1625
English MPs 1626
English MPs 1628–1629
High Sheriffs of Surrey
High Sheriffs of Sussex